John Corvan (13 January 1804 – 11 May 1897) was an Irish Anglican priest. 

Corvan was  educated at Trinity College, Dublin, He was ordained in 1828. He was  Archdeacon of  Ferns from 1871 to 1875.

Notes

Alumni of Trinity College Dublin
Irish Anglicans
Archdeacons of Ferns